Silvestre João Freitas Pinheiro, known as Silvestre (born 17 February 1984) is a Portuguese football player who plays for Fafe.

Club career
He made his professional debut in the Segunda Liga for União da Madeira on 23 October 2011 in a game against Belenenses.

References

1984 births
Sportspeople from Guimarães
Living people
Portuguese footballers
U.D. Leiria players
G.D. Tourizense players
Moreirense F.C. players
AD Fafe players
C.F. União players
Liga Portugal 2 players
Association football defenders